Sidney "Sid" Applebaum (February 28, 1924 – August 6, 2016) was an American businessman, the cofounder of Rainbow Foods.

Biography
He was born in Saint Paul, Minnesota on February 28, 1924 to Oscar and Bertha Applebaum. He was the youngest son and second youngest child of nine.  His parents immigrated to the United States from Russia on their honeymoon. Oscar Applebaum sold produce door-to-door in St. Paul, Minnesota from a horse-drawn wagon.  Oscar opened a fruit stand on the corner of St. Peter and 7th streets in downtown St. Paul with a $65 loan from his eldest son. That fruit stand became the first Applebaum's Food Market. As a young boy, Sid Applebaum bundled soap, bagged rice, worked as a box boy and delivered fruit and produce for his father's fruit stand. Applebaum graduated from Humboldt Senior High School in west St. Paul and continued to grow the family business.

By 1979, the family business included about 30 metro-area Applebaum's stores and one in Duluth. In 1979, the chain was sold to National Tea Co., and Applebaum continued on, working for them. The chain was subsequently sold to Gateway Foods. Sid Applebaum and Gateway Foods CEO, D. B. Reinhart, grew the Applebaum's supermarket chain to become the second-largest grocery chain in the Minneapolis–Saint Paul area by embracing Applebaum's idea to launch Rainbow Foods by converting some of the old Applebaum stores to the new brand. The chain was founded October 1, 1983.

Applebaum was president of Rainbow Foods through several ownership changes until 1996. In 1997, Applebaum bought four Holiday Foods stores in Bloomington, Fridley, Plymouth and Burnsville.  Eighteen months later, the stores were sold to Supervalu and were converted to Cub Foods stores.

In his final days, he became ill and used a walker.  However, Sid Applebaum worked until less than a week before his death in Minnetonka on August 6, 2016 at the age of 92.  Applebaum and his wife, Lorraine, would have celebrated their 70th wedding anniversary on September 17, 2016.  Besides his wife and son and daughter, survivors include another daughter, Nancy Rosenberg of Minnetonka, eight grandchildren and five great-grandchildren.

Applebaum won many awards and was heavily involved in the Twin Cities community.  His children said he helped run the St. Paul Winter Carnival and the Olympic Festival.

References

1924 births
2016 deaths
Businesspeople from Saint Paul, Minnesota
American people of Russian-Jewish descent
20th-century American businesspeople